Maan is a part of Pune district close to Pune city, in the state of Maharashtra, India. Parts of the Rajiv Gandhi Infotech Park Phase 2 & 3 are located in it, which makes it an important region. It is under the administrative control of Pune Metropolitan Region Development Authority (PMRDA). Maan was a rural area, but with the establishment of multinational companies and construction of residential high-rises since the noughties, it has developed into an urban center.

Transport
Maan is connected by Megapolis Circle station of the metro railway to various parts of Pune. Air-conditioned and ordinary bus services are available for its residents.

References

Neighbourhoods in Pimpri-Chinchwad